Björn Arne Nittmo (born July 26, 1966) is a former Swedish born American football placekicker, being the only Swedish-born player ever to complete as much as a full season in the National Football League.

Football career
The left-footed Nittmo, famous for his very long kickoffs, came to the U.S. as a foreign exchange student at Enterprise High School in Enterprise, Alabama. After high school, he played college football at Appalachian State University (1985–1988), where he also was the all-time leading scorer with 277 points. In 2003, he was named to the university's 75th Anniversary Football Team.

Nittmo was the first Swedish-born player to play a full season in the NFL, when he played for the New York Giants in 1989. He also tried to make the Kansas City Chiefs' roster the following year, but was cut, then the following year was hired by the Buffalo Bills as a potential replacement for Scott Norwood after his infamous wide-right kick in Super Bowl XXV (the Bills nonetheless decided to keep Norwood for one more season instead).

Nittmo's career included time with the Montreal Machine of the World League of American Football (this league later became NFL Europe), the Cleveland Thunderbolts, Arizona Rattlers, and Tampa Bay Storm of the Arena Football League, as well as the Shreveport Pirates of the Canadian Football League. In 2005, Nittmo was invited to the Ottawa Renegades' training camp, but was cut prior to the start of the season.

In popular culture
Nittmo appeared on Late Night with David Letterman a few times during his stint with the New York Giants.  Letterman seemed to be obsessed with the kicker's name and even coined a new catchphrase to both celebrate and mock him; "Who do you think you are, Bjorn Nittmo?" Nittmo's celebrity continued when, in 1999, he appeared as the kicker in the football movie Oliver Stone's Any Given Sunday. Nittmo later starred in a 2015 mini-documentary, NITTMO, about his life, to inspire the Swedish youth to follow their dreams and study abroad.

Personal life
Nittmo has been estranged from his ex-wife, Mary Lois Nittmo, and his four children (three daughters and a son), for over a decade. He suffered severe brain damage from a hit he sustained in a 1997 preseason contest. Such was the extent of the damage from that, and other hits sustained on kickoffs, that his ex-wife banned football within the family household, refusing to watch any games on television or let his son play the game. In 2017, as part of a meeting arranged by The Buffalo News, Mary Lois went to Björn's home in Arizona, where he explained his absence and behavior; he stated that he mainly lives alone and is self-employed for his children's safety, that the short-term memory loss has been a hindrance to his employability, and that attempts to treat his condition have so far not succeeded. In April 2017, ESPN's SC Featured anthology recounted Nittmo's story.

References

Further reading

External links

AFL stats

1966 births
Living people
People from Lomma Municipality
Swedish players of American football
American football placekickers
Appalachian State Mountaineers football players
New York Giants players
Montreal Machine players
Cleveland Thunderbolts players
Canadian football placekickers
Shreveport Pirates players
Tampa Bay Storm players
Buffalo Destroyers players
Arizona Rattlers players
Carolina Cobras players
Kansas City Chiefs players
Sportspeople from Skåne County